The 1938 World Table Tennis Championships men's singles was the 12th edition of the men's singles championship. 

Bohumil Váňa defeated Richard Bergmann in the final, winning three sets to one to secure the title.

Results

See also
List of World Table Tennis Championships medalists

References

-